Each "article" in this category is a collection of entries about several stamp issuers, presented in alphabetical order. The entries are formulated on the micro model and so provide summary information about all known issuers.

See the :Category:Compendium of postage stamp issuers page for details of the project.

Smirne (Italian Post Office) 

Dates 	1909–1911
Currency  	40 paras = 1 piastre

Refer 	Italian Post Offices in the Turkish Empire

Smyrne (Russian Post Office) 

Dates 	1909–1910
Currency  	40 paras = 1 piastre

Refer 	Russian Post Offices in the Turkish Empire

SO 1920 

Refer 	East Silesia

Solomon Islands 

Dates 	1975–
Capital 	Honiara
Currency  	100 cents = 1 dollar

Main Article Postage stamps and postal history of the Solomon Islands

Includes 	British Solomon Islands

Somalia 

Under UN control with Italian administration 1950–60.  Became an independent republic in 1960 and was
enlarged by addition of Somaliland Protectorate.

Dates 	1950–
Capital  	Mogadishu
Currency  	(1950) 100 centesimi = 1 somalo
		(1961) 100 cents = 1 Somali shilling

Main Article Postage stamps and postal history of Somalia

Somalia (British Administration) 

Dates 	1950 only
Currency  	100 cents = 1 shilling

Refer 	BA/BMA Issues

Somalia (British Military Administration) 

BMA Somalia.

Dates 	1948– 1950
Currency  	100 cents = 1 shilling

Refer 	BA/BMA Issues

Somalia (British Occupation) 

Refer 	East Africa Forces

See also 	Somalia (British Administration);
		Somalia (British Military Administration)

Somaliland Protectorate 

Dates 	1904–1960
Capital  	Hargeisa
Currency  	(1904) 16 annas = 1 rupee
		(1951) 100 cents = 1 shilling

Main Article Postage stamps and postal history of British Somaliland

Includes 	British Somaliland

Soruth (Saurashtra) 

Stamps of Soruth (Saurashtra) were at first issued in Junagadh only but later were extended to include the
Saurashtra Union of Jasdan, Morvi, Nawanagar, Soruth and Wadhwan.  Stamps of the 1929–1949 period were
overprinted SARKARI.

Dates 	1864–1949
Capital 	Junagadh
Currency  	12 pies = 1 anna; 16 annas = 1 rupee

Refer 	Indian Native States

Soudan 

Refer 	Sudan

South Africa 

Dates 	1910–
Capital 	Pretoria
Currency  	(1910) 12 pence = 1 shilling; 20 shillings = 1 pound
		(1961) 100 cents = 1 rand

Main Article Postage stamps and postal history of South Africa

South African Republic 

Dates 	1869–1902
Capital 	Pretoria
Currency  	12 pence = 1 shilling; 20 shillings = 1 pound

Refer 	Transvaal

South African Territories 

Main Article Needed 

Includes 	Bophutatswana;
		Ciskei;
		Transkei;
		Venda

South Arabian Federation 

Dates 	1963–1968
Capital  	Aden
Currency  	(1963) 100 cents = 1 shilling
		(1965) 1000 fils = 1 dinar

Refer 	Aden Protectorate States

South Australia 

Dates 	1855–1912
Capital 	Adelaide
Currency  	12 pence = 1 shilling; 20 shillings = 1 pound

See also 	Australia

South Bulgaria 

Dates 	1885 only
Capital 	Plovdiv (Philippopolis)
Currency  	40 paras = 1 piastre

Refer 	Bulgarian Territories

South China (People's Post) 

Dates 	1949 only
Currency  	100 cents = 1 dollar

Refer 	CPR Regional Issues

South East Saxony (Russian Zone) 

Dates 	1945–1946
Capital 	Dresden
Currency  	100 pfennige = 1 mark

Refer 	Germany (Allied Occupation)

South Georgia 

Dates 	1963–1980
Capital 	Grytviken
Currency  	(1963) 12 pence = 1 shilling; 20 shillings = 1 pound
		(1971) 100 pence = 1 pound

Refer 	South Georgia & South Sandwich Islands

South Georgia (Falkland Islands Dependencies) 

Stamps of Falkland Islands overprinted SOUTH GEORGIA.

Dates 	1944–1946
Capital 	Grytviken
Currency  	12 pence = 1 shilling; 20 shillings = 1 pound

Refer 	Falkland Islands Dependencies

South Georgia & South Sandwich Islands 

A continuation of the South Georgia issues but with the inscription changed to acknowledge the South Sandwich
Islands as part of the same territory.  The South Sandwich Islands have never had any permanent inhabitants.

Dates 	1980–
Capital 	Grytviken
Currency  	100 pence = 1 pound

Main Article Needed  Postage stamps and postal history of South Georgia and the South Sandwich Islands

Includes 	South Georgia

South Kasai 

Dates 	1961–1962
Capital 	Lusambo
Currency  	100 centimes = 1 franc

Refer 	Zaire

South Korea 

Dates 	1946–
Capital 	Seoul
Currency  	(1946) 100 chon = 1 won
		(1953) 100 won = 1 hwan
		(1962) 100 chon = 1 won

Main Article Postage stamps and postal history of South Korea

South Korea (North Korean Occupation) 

Dates 	1950 only
Currency  	100 chon = 1 won

Refer 	North Korea

South Lithuania (Russian Occupation) 

Russian forces in Grodno issued Arms types of Russia with an overprint of LIETUVA and a surcharge
in local currency.

Dates 	1919 only
Currency  	100 skatiku = 1 auksinas

Refer 	Russian Occupation Issues

South Orkneys (Falkland Islands Dependencies) 

Dates 	1944–1946
Currency  	12 pence = 1 shilling; 20 shillings = 1 pound

Refer 	Falkland Islands Dependencies

South Russia 

Refer 	Russian Civil War Issues

South Shetlands (Falkland Islands Dependencies) 

Dates 	1944–1946
Currency  	12 pence = 1 shilling; 20 shillings = 1 pound

Refer 	Falkland Islands Dependencies

South Sudan 

Dates 	2011-
Capital 	Juba
Currency  	100 piaster = 1 pound

Main Article Postage stamps and postal history of South Sudan

South Vietnam 

Dates 	1955–1976
Capital 	Saigon
Currency  	100 cents = 1 piastre

Main Article Needed 

See also 	National Front for Liberation of South Vietnam;
		North Vietnam;
		Vietnam

South West Africa 

Dates 	1923–1991
Capital 	Windhoek
Currency  	(1923) 12 pence = 1 shilling; 20 shillings = 1 pound
		(1961) 100 cents = 1 rand

Main Article Needed 

See also 	German South West Africa;
		Namibia

South West China (People's Post) 

Dates 	1949–1950
Currency  	100 cents = 1 dollar

Refer 	CPR Regional Issues

Southern Cameroons 

Dates 	1960–1961
Capital 	Mamfe
Currency  	12 pence = 1 shilling; 20 shillings = 1 pound

Refer 	Nigerian Territories

Southern Nigeria 

Dates 	1901–1914
Capital 	Enugu
Currency  	12 pence = 1 shilling; 20 shillings = 1 pound

Refer 	Nigerian Territories

Southern Rhodesia 

Dates 	1924–1964
Capital 	Salisbury
Currency  	12 pence = 1 shilling; 20 shillings = 1 pound

Refer 	Rhodesia

Southern Yemen 

Dates 	1968–1971
Capital 	Aden
Currency  	1000 fils = 1 dinar

Refer 	Yemen

Southern Zone, Morocco 

Dates 	1956–1958
Capital 	Rabat
Currency  	100 centimes = 1 franc

Refer 	Morocco

See also 	French Morocco

References

Bibliography 
 Stanley Gibbons Ltd, Europe and Colonies 1970, Stanley Gibbons Ltd, 1969
 Stanley Gibbons Ltd, various catalogues
 Stuart Rossiter & John Flower, The Stamp Atlas, W H Smith, 1989
 XLCR Stamp Finder and Collector's Dictionary, Thomas Cliffe Ltd, c.1960

External links
 AskPhil – Glossary of Stamp Collecting Terms
 Encyclopaedia of Postal History

Sm